The 2021–21 season of Ghanaian club Aduana Stars F.C . The season covered the period from 20 November 2020 to 8 August 2021

Season overview 
Aduana Stars ended the 2020-21 season without a trophy after placing fourth in the domestic the league and was knock out by Ashanti Gold S.C. in the FA Cup

Technical team 
The technical team

Squad

Competitions

Premier League

League table

References 
2020–21 Ghana Premier League by team
Aduana Stars F.C.